John C. Gregory Jr. (June 8, 1927 – December 4, 2014) was an American football player, coach, and college athletics administrator.  He served as the head football coach at East Stroudsburg University of Pennsylvania (1959–1965), Villanova University (1967–1969), and the University of Rhode Island (1970–1975), compiling a career college football record of 87–57–4.  He was the athletic director at Bowling Green State University from 1982 to 1994.

Gregory attended high in Lansdowne, Pennsylvania. He played college football at West Chester Teachers College—now known as West Chester University, before transferring to East Stroudsburg in 1949. Gregory played as lineman at East Stroudsburg for three seasons and graduated in 1952.

Gregory began his coaching career at William Penn High School in New Castle, Delaware, where he was an assistant to head football coach Billy Cole in 1952 and 1953, coaching the line. He was hired as the head football coach at P. S. Dupont High School in Wilmington, Delaware in 1954, where he tally a mark of 25–15 in five seasons.
He died in Philadelphia in 2014.

Head coaching record

College

References

External links
 

1927 births
2014 deaths
American football guards
Bowling Green Falcons athletic directors
East Stroudsburg Warriors football coaches
East Stroudsburg Warriors football players
Navy Midshipmen football coaches
Rhode Island Rams football coaches
Villanova Wildcats football coaches
West Chester Golden Rams football coaches
High school football coaches in Delaware
People from Delaware County, Pennsylvania
Coaches of American football from Pennsylvania
Players of American football from Pennsylvania